The Farah Palmer Cup (formerly known as Women's Provincial Championship until 2016), is the highest level domestic women's rugby union competition in New Zealand and is named after the former Black Ferns captain, Farah Palmer. This contest is held annually from early July to mid September and managed by the New Zealand Rugby Union, or NZRU. The competition was first introduced in 1999, with a total of fourteen teams competing initially. The number of teams increased to eighteen in the year 2000, but has decreased to as few as six teams, with 13 currently featured. Canterbury are the current holders of the JJ Stewart Trophy, the women's equivalent of the Ranfurly Shield. The Farah Palmer Cup is an amateur competition; players are not paid salaries and hold jobs outside of rugby.

Competition format

All teams face each other at least once, with the top four teams in the championship proceeding to the semi-finals. From 2011 to 2014, the semi-finals round was eliminated and the top two teams in the championship automatically qualified for the finals. In 2015, the semi-finals round was reintroduced.

In 2017 the Farah Palmer Cup was split into two divisions with promotion and relegation between the two. The top division is named the Premiership while the bottom is called the Championship. A team will play every team in their division once in the regular season before a semi-final then final for each division. In 2019 Northland joined the competition, causing the Premiership to expand to seven teams and leaving the Championship at six teams.

In 2020 the competition was instead run in two pools split geographically between the north and south of New Zealand. The north pool contains seven teams and the south pool contains six, a single round robin is played in each pool. The top two teams from each pool take part in a crossover semi-finals with the final being held a week later.

In 2021 and 2022, the FPC reverted to its original format with all 13 teams being split into two divisions with a promotion and relegation system. The top division is named the Premiership while the bottom division is named the Championship. A Round-Robin format was also used in the regular season to determine which teams will make the playoffs in the Semi Final's and the Grand Final.

Teams

1. * Denotes Town/City named the same as the region.

Champions

Premiership

Championship

Past Premierships

Total Wins

Notes and references

External links
 Official Facebook of the New Zealand Women's Rugby
 Official website of the ITM Cup

Women's rugby union competitions in New Zealand
Rugby union competitions for provincial teams
1999 establishments in New Zealand